José Vide (born 4 February 1987) is an East Timorese footballer who plays as a midfielder for Carsae. He made his senior international debut against Cambodia on 5 October 2012.

References 

1987 births
Living people
Association football midfielders
Indonesian footballers
East Timorese footballers
Timor-Leste international footballers
East Timorese expatriate footballers
East Timorese expatriate sportspeople in Spain
Expatriate footballers in Lithuania
Expatriate footballers in Indonesia
Expatriate footballers in Spain
East Timorese men's futsal players
People from Sleman Regency
Indonesian people of East Timorese descent